The Gilbert and Ellice Islands (GEIC as a colony) in the Pacific Ocean were part of the British Empire from 1892 to 1976. They were a protectorate from 1892 to 12 January 1916, and then a colony until 1 January 1976. The history of the colony was mainly characterized by phosphate mining on Ocean Island. In October 1975, these islands were divided by force of law into two separate colonies, and they became independent nations shortly thereafter: the Ellice Islands became Tuvalu in 1978, and the Gilbert Islands became part of Kiribati in 1979.

Location

The Gilbert Islands (sometimes also known as Kingsmill Islands or King's-Mill Islands) are a chain of sixteen atolls and coral islands in the western Pacific Ocean. They are part of Remote Oceania, and traditionally part of the Micronesia subregion of Oceania. The Gilbert Islands are the main part of what is now the Republic of Kiribati ("Kiribati" is the Gilbertese rendition of "Gilberts") The atolls of the Gilbert Islands are arranged in an approximate north-to-south line. 

Geographically, the Equator is the dividing line between the northern Gilbert Islands and the southern Gilbert Islands. South of the Gilbert Islands lie the Ellice Islands (now called Tuvalu), which were previously politically connected with them. The Ellice Islands comprise three reef islands and six true atolls, spread out between the latitude of 5° to 10° south and longitude of 176° to 180°, west of the International Date Line. The Ellice Islands are midway between Hawaii and Australia, and they, too, lie in the Polynesia subregion of Oceania.

European Discovery and naming

In 1568, when Spanish navigator Álvaro de Mendaña de Neira was commissioned to explore the South Pacific, he sailed relatively close to the Gilbert Islands. He sailed between the Line Islands and the Phoenix Islands, but without sighting land. However, he ultimately discovered what he called "Isla de Jesús", (probably Nui, amongst the Ellice island group).

In 1606, Pedro Fernandes de Queirós sighted two of the islands in the Gilbert island group: Butaritari and Makin, which he named the Buen Viaje Islands (‘good trip’ islands in Spanish).

In 1788, Thomas Gilbert, a British captain, encountered the archipelago while commanding one of two ships of the First Fleet that were looking for an outer passage route from Port Jackson to Canton. In 1820, a Russian admiral, Johann von Krusenstern, named the group “îles Gilbert” (French for Gilbert Islands) in honor of Captain Gilbert’s earlier discovery. Around that time, the French captain Louis Duperrey became the first to map the whole Gilbert Islands archipelago. He commanded La Coquille, circumnavigating the globe between 1822 and 1825.

The first recorded sighting by Europeans of an Ellice Island was on 16 January 1568, during the voyage of Álvaro de Mendaña from Spain, who sailed past Nui and charted it as Isla de Jesús (Spanish for "Island of Jesus") because the previous day was the feast of the Holy Name. Mendaña made contact with the islanders but was unable to land. During Mendaña's second voyage across the Pacific, he passed Niulakita on 29 August 1595, which he named La Solitaria. He charted the atolls as Lagoon Islands. Nanumea was explored by Spanish naval officer Francisco Mourelle de la Rúa who sailed past it on 5 May 1781 with frigate La Princesa, when attempting a southern crossing of the Pacific from the Philippines to New Spain. He charted Nanumea as San Augustin. 

In 1809, Captain Patterson in the brig Elizabeth sighted Nanumea while passing through the northern Tuvalu waters on a trading voyage from Port Jackson, Sydney, Australia to China. Captain Arent de Peyster sighted the rest of the Ellice island group in 1819, while sailing the ship Rebecca. He named Funafuti atoll “Ellice's Island,” after Edward Ellice, a British politician and merchant  who owned the ship’s cargo. After the work of English hydrographer Alexander George Findlay was published, the name Ellice was applied to all nine islands in the Ellice Island group, which is now called Tuvalu.

Until 1977, the Gilbert and Ellice Islands Colony (GEIC) was designated ISO 3166-1 alpha-2 (country code "GE").

In the 1930s, British officials tried to choose a less cumbersome name for the GEIC. Critics jocularly called the arbitrary collection of atolls scattered across the central Pacific the “Gilbert and Sullivans” (a reference to the famous light opera composers). One official suggested renaming the islands “Quateria” (after the word “quarters”), because the main inhabited archipelago extends over four notable quarters of the globe: It lies partly north and partly south of the equator, and also partly east and partly west of the international dateline. There were indigenous names, such as Tungaru and Tuvalu, but they were used to refer to only some of the islands in the group; they did not include the mostly uninhabited Phoenix and Line island groups, or Banaba (also called Ocean Island), whose phosphate rocks provided half of the GEIC’s tax revenue. Further complicating the naming problem, the Tokelau atolls were made part of the colony for a decade (1916–1926), and at one point a governor of Fiji, Sir J.B. Thurston, suggested adding Rotuma to the colony to enable a more organized administration of islands that were scattered over such a vast expanse of water. In 1969, after political issues arose that had led to the creation, four years earlier, of the Gilbertese National Party, the hybrid term “Tungavalu” was suggested (combining the indigenous names for the islands of Tungaru and Tuvalu); the idea was rejected because of political tensions between those islands.

Administration of the Gilbert and Ellice Islands

Protectorate administered as part of the British Western Pacific Territories

In 1857, the British established a protectorate over this general area (but not specifically over these islands), under the Pacific Islanders Protection Act In 1877, they established one over the British Western Pacific Territories.
In 1886, an Anglo-German agreement partitioned the “unclaimed” central Pacific, leaving Nauru in the German sphere of influence, while placing Ocean Island and the future GEIC in the British sphere of influence.

German New Guinea was established in 1884, and German protectorates were established on the Marshall Islands and  Nauru, in 1885 and 1888, respectively. Then, between 27 May and 17 June 1892, partly in response to the presence of the United States in Butaritari, Captain E.H.M. Davis R.N., of  made the sixteen islands of the Gilbert Islands a British protectorate. Between 9 and 16 October of the same year, Captain Gibson R.N., of  declared the Ellice Islands to be a British protectorate. The British government found it administratively  convenient to govern the Ellice and Gilberts islands together. It gave the British governor in Fiji the authority to establish an administration in the Gilberts. He eventually visited the islands and appointed a single resident commissioner and local tax collectors. At first, the British Western Pacific Territories (BWPT) were administered by a high commissioner who resided in Fiji (and later in the British Solomon Islands). Then, Sir John Bates Thurston appointed Charles Richard Swayne as the first resident commissioner of the Ellice Islands in 1892 and as the first resident commissioner of the Gilbert Islands in 1893. He was succeeded in 1895 by William Telfer Campbell, who established himself on Tarawa, and remained in office until 1908. Campbell was criticised for his legislative, judicial and administrative management. It was alleged that he extracted forced labour from the islanders. An inquiry into this allegation was held by Arthur William Mahaffy, a former district officer in the Gilbert and Ellice Islands (1896–1898), and he issued his findings in 1909. In 1913, an anonymous correspondent to The New Age journal described the maladministration of Telfer Campbell, linked it to criticisms of the Pacific Phosphate Company, which was operating on Ocean Island, and questioned Mahaffy’s impartiality.

In 1908, the government’s headquarters was moved to Ocean Island (today known as Banaba). Ocean Island had been hastily added to the protectorate in 1900 to take advantage of the improved shipping connections resulting from the Pacific Phosphate Company's increased activities. On 12 January 1916, the islands’ status was changed to that of a Crown Colony. The British colonial authorities emphasised that their role was to procure labour for phosphate mining on Ocean Island, and to maintain law and order among the workers.

Gilbert and Ellice Islands Colony (GEIC)

The islands became a Crown colony on 12 January 1916 by the Gilbert and Ellice Islands Order in Council, 1915.

During the year 1916, the Union Islands (Tokelau) were also annexed to the Gilbert and Ellice Islands colony. On 28 November 1919, Great Britain reasserted its claim to Christmas Island and annexed it to the colony.

In July 1920, the Pacific Phosphate Company was liquidated and its assets sold to the British Phosphate Commission (BPC), a consortium established by the governments of Great Britain, Australia and New Zealand. The mining of the phosphate on Ocean Island represented the main revenue of the colony until it ended in 1979.

In 1925, Great Britain asked New Zealand to accept responsibility for the administration of the Union Islands (Tokelau) and invited the United States to annex Swains Island. On 4 March 1925, the United States officially annexed Swains Island as part of the territory of American Samoa. On 11 February 1926, an Order in Council transferred responsibility for administration of the Union Islands (Tokelau) to New Zealand which in turn placed administration of the islands under its Western Samoan mandate.

Fanning Island and Washington Island also became included in the colony together with the Union Islands (now known as Tokelau); Christmas Island was included in 1919 but was unofficially contested by the USA under its Guano Islands Act of 1856. The Union Islands were transferred to New Zealand in 1926, but formally only in 1948.

The Gilbert and Ellice Islands colony continued to be administered by a Resident Commissioner. In 1930 the Resident Commissioner, Arthur Grimble, issued revised laws, Regulations for the good Order and Cleanliness of the Gilbert and Ellice Islands, which replaced laws created during the BWTP.

On 31 December 1936, the population of the Crown Colony totalled 34,443 inhabitants, including 32,390 Gilbert and Ellice Islanders, 262 Europeans and 923 Chinese ("Mongoloids"). Henry Evans Maude, the land commissioner of the colony, considered the then colony overcrowded. The Phoenix Islands were added to the colony in 1937 with the view of a Phoenix Islands Settlement Scheme.  On 6 August 1936, a party from HMS Leith landed on Canton Island in the Phoenix Group and planted a sign asserting British sovereignty in the name of King Edward VIII. On 18 March 1937, Great Britain annexed the uninhabited Phoenix Islands (except Howland and Baker Islands) to the Gilbert and Ellice Islands colony.

Banaba (Ocean Island) remained the headquarters of the colony until the British evacuation in 1942 during the Pacific War when Ocean Island and the Gilbert Islands were occupied by the Japanese. The United States forces landed in Funafuti on 2 October 1942 and on Nanumea and Nukufetau in August 1943 and constructed an airfield on each island and other bases. The atolls of Tuvalu acted as a staging post during the preparation for the Battle of Tarawa and the Battle of Makin that commenced on 20 November 1943. Colonel Vivian Fox-Strangways, was the Resident Commissioner of the Gilbert and Ellice Islands Colony in 1941, who was located on Funafuti.

After World War II, the colony headquarters was re-established on Tarawa, first on Betio islet and subsequently on Bairiki islet.  In November 1945, Fox-Strangways was replaced as Resident Commissioner by Henry Evans Maude (1946 to 1949). He was succeed by John Peel, who retired in 1951.

By the Tokelau Act of 1948, sovereignty over Tokelau was transferred to New Zealand. The five islands of the Central and Southern Line Islands were added to the colony in 1972.

The Gilbertese initiated a cultural movement called Tungaru led by Reuben Uatioa and created the Gilbertese National Party in 1965, protesting that British rulers showed preference to Ellicean civil servants. The Elliceans (further Tuvaluans) were concerned about their minority status in the Gilbert and Ellice Islands Colony. In 1974, ethnic differences within the colony caused the Polynesians of the Ellice Islands to vote for separation from the Gilbert Islands (later Kiribati). On 1 October 1975, the Ellice Islands became the separate British colony of Tuvalu, but the separation was completed on 1 January 1976.

Transition to self-determination

In 1946, Tarawa, in the Gilbert Islands, was made the administrative capital, replacing Ocean Island. The headquarters of the Colony were transferred from Betio to Bairiki. This development included establishing the King George V Secondary School for boys and the Elaine Bernacchi Secondary School for girls.

A Colony Conference was organised at Marakei in 1956, which was attended by officials and representatives (magistrates) from each island in the Gilbert and Ellice Islands Colony, conferences were held every two years until 1962. The development of administration continued with the creation in 1963 of an Advisory Council of five officials and 12 representatives who were appointed by the Resident Commissioner. In 1964 an Executive Council was established with eight officials and eight representatives. The representative members were elected in the Gilbert and Ellice Islands Advisory Council election held in 1964. The Resident Commissioner was now required to consult the Executive Council regarding the creation of laws to make decisions that affected the Gilbert and Ellice Islands Colony.

The Tungaru Association was created by Reuben Uatioa to “promote Gilbertese culture and interests,” and in 1965, the Gilbertese National Party, first political party of the colony, was established with the same leader, protesting about the lack of consideration that British rulers have towards Gilbertese, preferring somehow the Ellicean civil servants. A Constitution was introduced in 1967, which created a House of Representatives for the Gilbert and Ellice Islands colony that comprised seven appointed officials and 23 members elected by the islanders. Tuvalu elected four members of the House of Representatives. The 1967 Constitution also established the Governing Council. The House of Representatives only had the authority to recommend laws; the Governing Council had the authority to enact laws following a recommendation from the House of Representatives.

A select committee of the House of Representatives was established to consider whether the constitution should be changed to give legislative power to the House of Representatives. The proposal was that Ellice Islanders woulda  be allocated 4 seats out of 24 member parliament, which reflected the differences in populations between Ellice Islanders and Gilbertese. It became apparent that the Elliceans were concerned about their minority status on the Gilbert and Ellice Islands Colony, and the Elliceans wanted equal representation to that of the Gilbertese. A new constitution was introduced in 1971, which provided that each of the Ellice Islands (except Niulakita) elected one representative. However, that did not end the Tuvaluan movement for separation.

In 1974 Ministerial government was introduced in the Gilbert and Ellice Islands colony through a change to the Constitution.

Elections and the transition to parliamentary government

The 1967 constitution created a House of Representatives (parliament), whose members were elected in the following elections:

 1967 Gilbert and Ellice Islands general election
 1971 Gilbert and Ellice Islands general election
 1974 Gilbert and Ellice Islands general election

Dissolution of the Gilbert and Ellice Islands colony

A referendum was held in Ellice Islands, including Elliceans living in Ocean Island and Tarawa, from July to September 1974, using a rolling ballot, to determine whether the Gilbert Islands and Ellice Islands should each have their own administration. The result of the referendum, was that 3,799 Elliceans voted for separation from the Gilbert Islands and continuance of British rule as a separate colony, and 293 Elliceans voted to remain as the Gilbert and Ellice Islands colony. There were 40 spoilt papers.

As a consequence of the 1974 Ellice Islands self-determination referendum, separation occurred in two stages. The Tuvaluan Order 1975 made by the Privy Council, which took effect on 1 October 1975, recognised Tuvalu as a separate British dependency with its own government. The second stage occurred on 1 January 1976 when two separate administrations were created out of the civil service of the Gilbert and Ellice Islands Colony. The British conducted a formal inquiry into Tuvaluan attitudes towards secession, and announced that a referendum was to be held, in which Tuvaluans could choose to remain with the Gilberts or secede. They were told that if they separated they would not receive royalties from the Ocean Island phosphate or other assets of the colony. Despite this, 3,799 Tuvaluans (92%) voted to secede, while 293 voted against separation. On 1 October 1975, legal separation from the Gilbert Islands (now Kiribati), took place. On 1 January 1976, full administration of the new colony was transferred from South Tarawa to Funafuti. Tuvalu became an independent constitutional monarchy and the 38th member of the Commonwealth of Nations on 1 October 1978.

The Gilbert Islands attained independence on 12 July 1979 under the name Kiribati by the Kiribati Independence Order 1979, as a republic with Commonwealth membership. That day the colonial flag was lowered for the last time with a parade commemorating both the newly independent state and in memorial of the intense battles fought on Tarawa in World War II. The parade included many dignitaries from home and abroad. The name Kiribati (pronounced kʲiriˈbas) is the local writing rendition of "Gilberts" in the Gilbertese language.

Banaba, formerly rich in phosphates before becoming fully depleted in the latter colonial years, also sued for independence in 1979 and boycotted the Kiribati ceremonies. The Banabans wanted greater autonomy and reparations of around $250 million for revenue they had not received and for environmental destruction caused by phosphate mining practices similar to those on Nauru. The British authorities had relocated most of the population to Rabi Island, Fiji, after 1945, but by the 1970s some were returning to Banaba. The British rejected the Banaban independence proposal, and the island remained under the jurisdiction of Kiribati.

Social history
In 1935, there were 33,713 people in the Colony. Compared to 1934 the figures were: Gilbertese, 29,291 (28,654); Ellice Islanders, 4,154 (4,042); Europeans, 244 (254); Chinese (exclusive of indentured labourers), 24 (41). 
In 1935, there were 6,924 children receiving primary standard education through 4 government schools and 79 mission schools operated by the London Missionary Society (LMS) and the Roman Catholic Sacred Heart Order. Throughout the Gilbert Islands, instruction was given in the Gilbertese language, except at the King George V. School (Tarawa) and the Sacred Heart Boys’ School (Butaritari), where instruction was delivered in English. In the Ellice Islands, instruction was delivered in the Samoan language, due to the influence of the early LMS Samoan missionaries and the affinity of the Ellice language with Samoan.
During 1935 two students of the King George V. School were sent to the Central Medical School at Suva, Fiji. This made 4 students, 2 Gilbertese and 2 Ellice Islanders being trained as Native Medical Practitioners (as medical practitioners from the islands were described). Eight former students of King George V. School were employed as Native Medical Practitioners in the Colony.

In 1953, the enrolments were: in 12 government schools (722 pupils); the London Missionary Society (4,392); the Roman Catholic Sacred Heart Mission (3,088); and the Seventh Day Adventist Mission, which established schools in the Gilberts in 1950 (165). 
New premises for the King George V. School were opened on Bikenibeu, Tarawa, with 109 students, some of whom came from the Government Temporary School at Abemama and other boys came from Elisefou school on Vaitupu, which was also closed. A new curriculum was introduced for primary schools which included instruction in English to the older aged students. The lack of proficiency in the English language was limiting the performance of students at the secondary school level and those seeking to attend universities in other countries.

The Gilbert and Ellice Islands were represented at the 1963 Pacific Games at Suva, Fiji, by tennis players, and also table tennis players who won a bronze medal. A larger team was sent to the 1966 Pacific Games at Nouméa, New Caledonia, including athletes to compete in the half-mile, mile and the high jump event.

A census in 1968 counted the population of the colony at 53,517 residents. 44,206 were in the Gilbert Islands, 5,782 in the Ellice Islands, 2,192 in Ocean Island and 1,180 in the Line Islands. From this total 7,465 were “Polynesians” (mostly from Tuvalu) and 1,155 “Others” (Europeans and Mongoloids).

Postal history 

The Gilbert and Ellice Islands used their own postage stamps from 1911.

References
Footnotes

Citations

Further reading

 Barrie Macdonald, Cinderellas of the Empire: towards a history of Kiribati and Tuvalu, Suva, Fiji: Institute of Pacific Studies, University of the South Pacific, 2001.  (Australian National University Press, first published 1982).
 Kiribati. Aspects of History, by Alaima Talu (ed.) and 24 others authors. Published jointly by: the Institute of Pacific Studies and Extension Services, University of the South Pacific and the Ministry of Education, Training and Culture, Kiribati Government, 1979
 Henry Evans Maude: The Gilbert Islands observed. A source book of European contacts with, and observations of, the Gilbert Islands and the Gilbertese, from 1537 to 1873. Compiled by H. E. Maude. Homa Press, Adelaide 2006.
 A Pattern of Islands (US title: We Chose the Islands) by Sir Arthur Grimble, John Murray & Co, London, 1952 (A Pattern of Islands republished 2011 by Eland, London)
 Return to the Islands by Sir Arthur Grimble, John Murray & Co, London, 1957 
 John Smith, An Island in the Autumn: How the Gilbert and Ellice Islands Gained Independence, 2011, . Publisher: Librario Publishing.
 Ghost Stories and Other Island Tales by I.E. Butler, published by Tom Butler, 2014,  An account of the life of a young colonial officer in the 1950s in the Gilbert Islands.

 
British Western Pacific Territories
History of Kiribati
History of Tuvalu
Gilbert Islands
Former British colonies and protectorates in Oceania
States and territories established in 1892
States and territories disestablished in 1976

1892 establishments in Oceania
1976 establishments in Oceania
1892 establishments in the British Empire
1976 disestablishments in the British Empire

20th century in Kiribati
Kiribati and the Commonwealth of Nations
Tuvalu and the Commonwealth of Nations
Eastern Indo-Pacific
Marine ecoregions